"The General Uses Warp" is a North Korean song praising Kim Jong-il. The song was first released in 1996 by Wangjaesan Light Music Band, with lyrics written by Chong Ryol and music composed by Kim Un-ryong.

Background 
The song claims that Kim Jong-il and his father Kim Il-sung could use chukjibeop, a magic ability attributed to xians, Taoist immortals, also known as suōdì in Chinese and shukuchi in Japanese. It literally means "earth-shrinking" and describes mythical techniques of rapid movement and teleportation. The story dates back to pre-war times, when a legend arouse that Korean guerilla fighters, including Kim Il-sung, used this ability to escape Japanese forces during the war for independence.

This was one of many methods used to deify and exalt the leaders since the Kim Jong-il era, along with claims that Kim Jong-un can bring good weather when he travels. In 2019, however, Kim Jong-un instructed the propaganda workers to stay away from mystification of the leaders. While his father distanced himself from the public with such supernatural praise, the current supreme leader chooses to imitate his grandfather Kim Il-sung, who worked to create a friendly and relatable image.

Lyrics

Reaction 
Despite being created to praise North Korean leader Kim Jong-il, the song became a meme and a source of parodies in South Korea due to its absurd themes. Praising North Korean regime is criminal under the South Korean law, but the use of this song and its parodies is tolerated as it is perceived as ironic and satirical.

In 2012, when the website of the left-wing Unified Progressive Party was hacked, the hackers used this song as background music on its main page.

In 2020, the Korean Workers' Party newspaper Rodong Sinmun published a purported anecdote from 1945 in which Kim Il-sung described methods of deception he used while fighting the Japanese forces, while denying the literal existence of chukjibeop:

This article was interpreted by South Korean and international media as a possible step back from the supernatural mystification of North Korea's leaders, in line with guidance that Kim Jong-un had provided a year earlier. However, the same article with minor differences was already published by the same North Korean newspaper in 2015 and again in 2018 without any media attention.

See also 
Music of North Korea
North Korean cult of personality
North Korean leaders' trains

References

External links
  (Wangjaesan Light Music Band version)

North Korean songs
Propaganda songs
Propaganda in North Korea
Patriotic songs
1996 songs
Songs about Kim Jong-il